The Cleveland Browns are a professional American football franchise based in Cleveland, Ohio. They are a member of the North Division of the American Football Conference (AFC) in the National Football League (NFL). The team began playing in 1946 as a charter member of the All-America Football Conference (AAFC), and joined the NFL as part of the AAFC–NFL merger in 1950. The team played their home games at Cleveland Stadium from 1946 to 1995 before moving to FirstEnergy Stadium (formerly Cleveland Browns Stadium), where they have played since 1999. The Browns did not play from 1996 to 1998 when the team's owner, Art Modell, moved the team to Baltimore, Maryland and formed the Baltimore Ravens. The team was re-activated under new ownership in Cleveland in 1999. The team is currently owned by Jimmy Haslam III.

There have been 18 non-interim head coaches for the Browns franchise. Their first head coach was Paul Brown, who coached for 17 complete seasons. Brown is also the franchise's all-time leader for the most regular season games coached (214), the most regular season game wins (158), the most playoffs games coached (14), and the most playoff game wins (9). Brown is the only Browns head coach to win an AAFC championship with four, the NFL championship with three, the Sporting News NFL Coach of the Year three times, the United Press International (UPI) NFL Coach of the Year once, and to have been elected into the Pro Football Hall of Fame as a coach. Blanton Collier, Dick Modzelewski, Sam Rutigliano, Bud Carson, Jim Shofner, Chris Palmer, Butch Davis, and Rob Chudzinski have spent their entire NFL head coaching careers with the Browns. Eric Mangini had been the head coach of the Browns since the firing of Romeo Crennel, but was himself fired on January 3, 2011. Shurmur replaced Mangini as head coach, but was fired after posting a 9–23 record over two seasons in charge. On January 11, 2013, the Cleveland Browns officially named Rob Chudzinski as the replacement for Pat Shurmur. Chudzinski compiled a 4–12 record during the 2013 season, but was fired on December 29. On January 23, 2014, the Browns hired Mike Pettine as their head coach. Pettine was fired on January 3, 2016, hours after the Browns lost their 2015 season finale. On January 13, 2016, Hue Jackson was named the Browns' new head coach. He was then fired on October 29, 2018 after only 3 wins in 40 games. He was replaced by defensive coordinator Gregg Williams on an interim basis. On January 9, 2019, Freddie Kitchens was promoted from interim offensive coordinator to head coach. He was fired on December 29 after the Browns finished the 2019 season with a 6–10 record. On January 13, 2020, Kevin Stefanski was named head coach.

Key

Coaches
Note: Statistics are accurate through the 2022 NFL season.

Footnotes

Notes
General
 
 

Specific

References
 

 
Cleveland Browns
Head coaches